The Sly Gap Formation is a geologic formation in south-central New Mexico. It preserves fossils dating back to the Frasnian Age of the late Devonian period.

Description
It disconformably overlies the Onate Formation and is overlain by the Percha Formation or the Contadero Formation. It pinches out in the west in the Basin and Range province.

Fossils
The formation includes crinoidal siltstone beds and many other beds are fossiliferous, bearing crinoid, brachiopod, bryozoan, anthozoan, cephalopod, gastropod, fish, and coral remains.

See also

 List of fossiliferous stratigraphic units in New Mexico
 Paleontology in New Mexico

Footnotes

References
 
 
 

Devonian formations of New Mexico
Devonian southern paleotemperate deposits